Pseudonocardia hydrocarbonoxydans is a bacterium from the genus of Pseudonocardia which has been isolated from air contaminant. Pseudonocardia hydrocarbonoxydans can oxidize hydrocarbons.

References

Pseudonocardia
Bacteria described in 1962